The Journal of Economic Perspectives (JEP) is an economic journal published by the American Economic Association. The journal was established in 1987. It is very broad in its scope. According to its editors its purpose is:

to synthesize and integrate lessons learned from active lines of economic research; 
to provide economic analysis of public policy issues; to encourage cross-fertilization of ideas among the fields of thinking; 
to offer readers an accessible source for state-of-the-art economic thinking; 
to suggest directions for future research; 
to provide insights and readings for classroom use; 
and to address issues relating to the economics profession.''

Its current editor is Heidi Williams, and its managing editor is Timothy Taylor.

References

External links 
Homepage

Economics journals
Publications established in 1987
Quarterly journals
Academic journals published by learned and professional societies of the United States
American Economic Association academic journals